William Chi-Cheng Chen is a Grandmaster of Yang-style t'ai chi ch'uan who currently lives in the US. His school is in New York City and he has hundreds of students around the world.

He was born in 1933 in Wenzhou, Zhejiang province, China. A US Passport error has his year of birth as 1935. After his family moved to Taiwan, he began studying t'ai chi ch'uan under the tutelage of Prof. Cheng Man-ch'ing who was a childhood friend of William C. C. Chen's father.

His skill, aptitude and language skills helped him become one of Prof. Cheng Man-ch'ing's favorite disciples. Not only was he an extraordinary student but he also helped as his teachers' translator. Through this he acquired a lot of knowledge from his teacher and insight from fellow students.

T'ai chi ch'uan lineage tree with Yang-style focus

Notes

References
Chen, William C.C.,An Autobiography of William C.C. Chen, http://www.williamccchen.com/biograph.htm April 2010
Robinson, Ronnie, Grandmaster William C.C. Chen Interview, http://www.taichiunion.com/magazine/wccc.html

Living people
1935 births
American tai chi practitioners